Nikita Anatolyevich Malyarov (born 23 October 1989) is a Russian professional football player.

Personal life
His younger brother Kirill Malyarov is also a professional footballer.

External links
 
 

1989 births
Footballers from Moscow
Russian Jews
Living people
Jewish footballers
Russian footballers
Association football midfielders
Russia under-21 international footballers
Russia national football B team footballers
FC Znamya Truda Orekhovo-Zuyevo players
FC Khimik Dzerzhinsk players
PFC Spartak Nalchik players
FC Volga Nizhny Novgorod players
FC Ufa players
FC Shinnik Yaroslavl players
FC Kuban Krasnodar players
FC Orenburg players
FC Khimki players
FC Rotor Volgograd players
FC Aktobe players
FC KAMAZ Naberezhnye Chelny players
Russian Premier League players
Russian First League players
Russian Second League players
Kazakhstan Premier League players
Maccabiah Games competitors for Russia
Maccabiah Games footballers
Russian expatriate footballers
Expatriate footballers in Kazakhstan
Russian expatriate sportspeople in Kazakhstan